Gen¹³ is a superhero team and comic book series originally written by Jim Lee and Brandon Choi and illustrated by J. Scott Campbell. It was published by WildStorm under the Image Comics banner, which went on to become an imprint for DC Comics, who continued publishing the Gen¹³ title. The comic features a loosely organized team of super-powered beings composed of five teens and their mentor.

Publication history
The series takes place in Jim Lee's Wildstorm Universe, and Gen¹³s stories and history intertwine with those from his own works, such as Wildcats and Team 7 (in fact, each of the main characters in Gen¹³ is the child of a Team 7 member).

The setup of the series is that a group of teens are invited to take part in a government project, which is in actuality a prison-like testing ground on "gen-active" teens. The teens make their escape, but not before they manifest superhuman powers, and are labelled dangerous fugitives. They rely on each other to fight their foes and unveil the personal secrets that linked them to Team 7 and International Operations.

After a very successful run ending with issue #20, co-creator and illustrator J. Scott Campbell handed the reins of Gen¹³ over to other creative teams, saying that leaving freed him up to work on both the Gen¹³/Batman crossover and his own new series (Danger Girl).

Following the run of Choi and Campbell were John Arcudi and Gary Frank. Their realistic style, both in writing and art, was a drastic change from the title's more fantastic elements. Following their run, Scott Lobdell returned the title to its less-serious, more-sexual roots, but still the title was not received well by fans.

After Lobdell's run, Adam Warren was assigned to the title. He had previously proven himself writing two stories using Gen¹³ characters ("Grunge: The Movie," published in Gen¹³ Bootleg, and the standalone mini-series Magical Drama Queen Roxy), as well as a two-issue fill-in piece featuring a pop idol who threatened to take over the world with a catchy song. Warren's run was well received by fans and critics, but sales did not support the title.

Despite outrageous story arcs and many artist collaborations, the popularity of the book dwindled to the point where Wildstorm decided to blow up the entire team with a 6-megaton bomb (Gen¹³ vol. 2, #76, June 2002). This served as the catalyst to revamp the series with a new first issue written by Chris Claremont with pencils by Ale Garza. This title featured an all new team mentored by Caitlin Fairchild, and spawned a spin-off series titled 21 Down. However, this title was cancelled after barely a year. The final issue of the series revealed that the original team was, in fact, still alive, and that the new series had taken place in an alternate dimension which had in some fashion crossed over with the known continuity.

During the height of its popularity, Gen¹³ spawned two spin-off books, DV8 and Gen¹³ Bootleg, as well as a number of specials and mini-series. The team also starred in crossovers with other comic book characters such as Superman, Spider-Man, the Maxx, Monkeyman and O'Brien, two crossovers with the Marvel Comics teen hero team Generation X, and a crossover with the Fantastic Four. At one point in the early years, Wildstorm and DC were planning a teamup between the team and Batman. However, due to creative differences between creator Brandon Choi and DC, the crossover never happened, although J. Scott Campbell did create artwork showing Fairchild, Grunge, Roxy, and Batman in a promotional image.

The title was "rebooted" in October 2006, initially written by Gail Simone with art from Talent Caldwell. At first, the title had no continuity with earlier series. The series was involved in the "Armageddon" crossover event and then taken over in 2008 with a new creative team, Scott Beatty and Mike Huddleston, as part of "World's End".

The new series was canceled along with the rest of the Wildstorm titles published at the time when the line folded. When the Wildstorm universe was subsequently folded into the DC Universe following Flashpoint, several of the members of Gen 13 began appearing in other titles. Caitlin Fairchild played a supporting role in Superboy and eventually began starring in the spin-off title The Ravagers.

Fictional team history

The original Gen¹³
International Operations started "government internship" for gifted youths, taking place in an isolated training facility. Following the manifestation of Caitlin Fairchild's powers, she fled the complex with Roxy Spaulding, Grunge, Burnout, and Threshold in disguise. They were later joined by Sarah Rainmaker. The project was revealed to be a gathering of the gen-active progeny of Team 7.

Threshold tricked the group, sans Fairchild, to return to base to help free the other kids, but upon their return they were apprehended for further testing. With the help of Pitt and John Lynch, the kids finally escaped. The group retreated to La Jolla, California, and officially formed as the group Gen¹³. They opposed I.O. and their violent counterpart, DV8. ("Gen¹³" loosely refers to the 13th generation of Americans. Team 7 had been part of a project called Gen12.)

The team spent a lot of time delving into the past of Team 7 to learn more about themselves. Fairchild and Freefall learned they were half-sisters and Lynch was revealed to be Burnout's father. Also during this time, Freefall and Grunge began to date, while Rainmaker revealed herself to be bisexual.

The team was caught in an explosion of a six-megaton bomb and believed to be dead. Fairchild was the only survivor and mentored a new Gen¹³ team, effectively taking Lynch's role. However, this team existed in what is later revealed to be an alternate reality which was similar to the mainstream Wildstorm universe except for its point of divergence, the last issue of Gen¹³ volume 2. At the end of volume 3, the rest of the original Gen¹³ team was revealed to be alive and, after time-traveling to avoid the detonation that "killed" them, the reunited group returned to the mainstream Wildstorm universe.

Wildstorm
In early 2006, Wildstorm brought all its in-continuity comics since WildC.A.T.s #1 to an end. The universe's finale came in the form of the crossover miniseries Captain Atom: Armageddon. Following the conclusion of this limited series, the entire Wildstorm line was relaunched with "Worldstorm." A new Gen¹³ series began. The entire world had a "soft reset"; the surroundings were mostly familiar, but there were changes throughout.

In the first arc, the future Gen¹³ are taken away from their home lives. It is revealed that their parents have been assigned to raise the children to encourage the emergence of specific personality-traits. In different areas of the country, Caitlin Fairchild, Roxy Spaulding, Eddie Chang, Bobby Lane, and Sarah Rainmaker wake up, each wearing a uniform recognized by their parents. Strike teams immediately attempt to capture the kids; many of their foster parents are terminated.

In the course of the series, it is eventually revealed that (in contrast to the previous iterations) these Gen¹³s were manipulated and formulated from birth by an unscrupulous biogenetics firm from I.O., called Tabula Rasa. Furthermore, the "souls" of the previous iterations of the Gen¹³s, previously collected by the Authority's Doctor, have settled into these bodies, and when the five of them are together, they cause people to forget their previous history, even those who knew them.

As a result of these new origins, the personalities, histories, and abilities of each character have displayed mild-to-massive differences from the previous canon. For instance, Burnout is now a former juvenile hall-resident-turned-reggae-loving pacifist, and John Lynch is a young grunt in I.O.'s employ. Rainmaker is retconned into being a lesbian rather than bisexual, Fairchild is suspicious and unhappy about her excessive beauty, and Grunge is portrayed as being secretly more-intelligent than even Caitlin. Outside of her newfound origins, the character of Freefall remains mostly consistent to previous iterations, save for a slightly greater level of confidence and self-reliance.

World's End

The series resumes following Number of the Beast as part of the "World's End" storyline, with the group coming out of a teleportation system in which they had been held (due to power loss) into a devastated New York approximately six months following the events of Number of the Beast.

Once they reach the surface from the underground lair, the group is shocked to see what has happened in New York (aside from Burnout, who is blind at this point). While Grunge is quick to claim that an asteroid, global warming, and other natural disasters were responsible for the destruction, Rainmaker blames terrorists. After a confrontation with several crazed metahuman-hunters, the group finally manages to escape New York.

Once outside of New York, the group finds themselves trapped in a mall with several mutated monsters, one of which seemingly infects Fairchild. While the group is holding together, tensions have begun to rise between Fairchild and Rainmaker, with the latter being attracted to the first. Burnout, while still blind, gains some semblance of vision with the ability to sense heat patterns.

During their stay at a skater park run by teens, Grunge is crowned king. He is originally thrilled about it but later finds out that his predecessor is to be eaten in a soup. Rainmaker, having witnessed Caitlin and Bobby kiss in a tent, grabs her gear and leaves the group without saying goodbye to anyone.

The other teens are confronted by the cloned scientist Dr. Cross, who created them after their original deaths; however, he and his assistant Megan are both stuck at ages five and nine, respectively, due to the loss of electricity caused by the cataclysm, while retaining their memories and intellects. They manage to save Grunge and to overpower the heavily-armed children-scientists due to the intervention of Goo, a Gen14. As they flee, it is revealed that Caitlin's power has failed, most probably due to the infection, and she suffers a serious knife injury.

Having nowhere else to go, they join the children-scientists, who promise to heal Caitlin. They arrive in a small town that is under the "protection" of a World War II supervillain team, the Fearsmiths (the imprisoned villains from Number of the Beast). The two groups clash, with Gen¹³ being easily beaten. Following another defeat, they are separated from Fairchild and the scientists as they are abducted by the Paladins, who offer to train them.

Unknown to any them, Goo was sent by the remnants of the U.S. military—specifically a branch who specialized in fighting metahumans. The squad was designed to apprehend Gen¹³ and have accordingly been practicing on a small group of Gen14s, of which Goo is a member. Naturally, their practice sessions ended with the Gen14s being killed, cloned, and their minds transferred and later modified so that they do not remember their ordeal. Oddly enough, Goo seems to be regaining some of her memories.

Currently on orders from the general in charge of the military squad, Gen14 has invaded the Paladins' headquarters and are ready to confront Gen¹³, which currently consists only of Burnout, Grunge, and Freefall.

The fight between the gen-actives and the military branch is over quickly with the Gen14 and military winning. Once they have been captured, Gen¹³ are offered an ultimatum: either join the military and serve them or be executed. In order to prove his point, the general shoots and kills Gen14's Windsprint. His plans, however, are crossed by Roxy, who levitates the Paladin base into space, knocking them all out due to oxygen deprivation.

In the meantime, Caitlin has fully mutated due to the Warhol virus to which she was exposed and is rampaging across town in a Hulk-like fashion. Her rampage is cut short as the Paladin base crash-lands next to her. The gen-actives band together and take on Caitlin, hoping to calm her down, but they do not succeed. Seeing no alternative, Goo sacrifices herself in order to short-circuit the virus, thus reverting Caitlin to her former self.

Three weeks later, Bobby, Roxy, Grunge, Caitlin, and the surviving Gen14s Runt and Ditto arrive at Tranquility (a town of retired super-heroes), only to find a crater where the town had been. The group decides not to despair and to go on even if it means that are heading into trouble.

The New 52
Gen¹³ briefly debuts in the epilogue of Supergirl issue #33; membership consists of the original lineup.

Characters
The original lineup of Gen¹³ was:
 Caitlin Fairchild: Once an ordinary girl, Caitlin's muscles spontaneously increased in density, granting her superhuman strength, agility, speed, and endurance. The manifestation of her "Gen-active" status caused her body mass and size to increase from a petite young woman into that of a statuesque Amazon, shredding her clothing at the time. Fairchild is by far the most intelligent of the group. She is also Freefall's half-sister. Often, she is portrayed as being either naively unaware of or mildly uncomfortable with her newly-curvaceous figure.
 Bobby "Burnout" Lane: Son of John Lynch (Gen¹³'s mentor), Bobby manifested the ability to generate and manipulate high-energy coherent plasma, which ignites on exposure to oxygen. He later developed the ability to fly as well as certain psionic abilities.
 Roxanne "Freefall" Spaulding: "Roxy" is the youngest gen-active teen, with the ability to control the effects of gravity on herself and on others. She can nullify gravity (and float) or multiply it (making objects ultraheavy). It is also suggested by some other characters that if she thought about it and used her powers to their fullest advantage, she could manipulate spacetime as this is related to gravity. She has a crush on Grunge and is jealous of Fairchild's physique. Keeps Queelocke as a "pet." It was later revealed that Spaulding and Fairchild were half-sisters, both the daughters of Alex Fairchild from Team 7.
 Sarah Rainmaker: Rainmaker can influence local weather systems, manipulating air currents to grant herself flight and direct water with a gesture. Amplifier bands on her wrists augment her ability to project lightning. Rainmaker is Apache and is Stephen Callahan's daughter and Threshold and Bliss' half-sister. Among the main characters, she is the most concerned with social and political issues. The rest of the team is still adjusting to her sexual orientation (she is attracted to women).
 Percival Edmund "Grunge" Chang: Able to mimic the molecular structure of any material he touches (and partially bestow this effect on others), Grunge is a surf rat who enjoys sleeping late. He possesses brown belts in five martial arts styles and has few if any redeeming characteristics—though he does possess a photographic memory that allowed him to take the same classes as Fairchild does (much to her surprise) during the period that the team went to college. His father is Team 7 member Phillip Chang.
 John Lynch: The team's mentor and father of Robert "Burnout" Lane. Lynch was the leader of Team 7 and close friend of the children's parents. His eye has been replaced after he gouged it out as a result of a mental attack. Like all surviving members of Team 7, Lynch was granted powerful telepathic and telekinetic abilities that are highly unstable and dangerous. Because of this, he avoids using his powers if at all possible.
 Anna: a heavily armed covert-assassination gynoid programmed to serve Gen¹³ as a maid and to love them as her own children.

The team recently added newcomers:
 Holly "Breakdown" Denton: Occasionally known as Goo, Holly has the ability to disassemble molecules, seemingly causing objects to melt into goo. She was formerly a member of Gen14. As of Gen¹³ vol. 4, #32, Holly has sacrificed her life to save Caitlin and was once more seen as an incubating clone.
 Amber "Ditto" LeRoux: Not much is known about Amber, only that Holly refers to her as a typical airhead. A former Gen14. Her power is infinite multiplicity which allows her to make an unlimited number of copies of herself.
 Guillermo "Runt" Sandoval: Not much is known about Guillermo. A former Gen14. His powers allow him to grow and shrink.
 Lance "Hardbody" Wieder: The second-in-command of the former Gen14. Not much is known about him at this point; during a fight between him and Gen¹³, his face was scarred by Holly, who was defending herself. He and Windsprint were left behind in order to recover. His powers include augmented strength/stamina and increased dermal density which makes him super-strong and near-invulnerable. Doctor Cross (the maker of the current Gen program) expressed interest in potential offspring between him and Caitlin Fairchild.
 Shaqira "Windsprint" Johnson: The speedster of Gen14. She was shot in the head by a crazed general and believed to be dead. However, it is revealed that her enhanced physiology also included a heightened metabolism allowing her to survive the gunshot. She and Hardbody had been originally left behind in order to recuperate.

Influences

Gen¹³s most obvious influence is Marvel Comics’ X-Men, which originally featured five young friends who were trained in secret by an older man, who tried to protect them from a dangerous world. Many of the more social aspects of the team were inspired by the second generation X-Men spin-off series: New Mutants. In fact, the original title of the book was to be Gen X, as seen in an early advertisement for the series in the second issue of StormWatch, but was later changed due to Marvel having an X-Men spin-off titled Generation X in development.

The character of Rainmaker highly resembled the X-Men's Storm in that both characters had weather controlling powers. Marvel's Spider-Man notes this similarity in a crossover issue, to the point of briefly mistaking her for Storm in their first encounter.

Also, the character of Freefall had her direct parallel in the character of Jubilee, both of whom had similar attitudes and physical attributes, including being the youngest in their respective teams. Freefall also had an unearthly pet, Qeelocke, which parallels the baby dragon Lockheed belonging to Kitty Pryde of the X-Men. Conceptual similarities among the pyrokinetic Burnout and the Fantastic Four's Human Torch are also quite evident.

John Lynch was inspired by Clint Eastwood, both in appearance and personality. Another influence is Marvel's character Nick Fury, who is also a one-eyed secret agent.

Many of the early Gen¹³ adventures also paralleled the X-Men. In issue #2 of the ongoing series, the team fought Helmut, a practically unbeatable armored opponent with a vendetta against the team's mentor, similar to the X-Men's Juggernaut. In the next five issues, the team went on an inadvertent world tour, similar to early adventures of the "All-New, All Different" X-Men of the 1970s. After their mansion was destroyed (a recurring element of the X-Men comics), the team went to a prehistoric island (similar to the X-Men's Savage Land), before going into outer space (X-Men's "The Dark Phoenix Saga"), and returning to a dark future (X-Men's "Days of Future Past"). Most of the X-Men parallels faded after this point when Brandon Choi was replaced by John Arcudi as writer on the series. However, it is worth noting that when WildStorm decided to revamp the series, they hired perennial X-Men writer Chris Claremont to do the job.

Another similar comic series that preceded Gen¹³ is the Valiant Comics title Harbinger, written by Valiant mastermind Jim Shooter. In the Harbinger series, a group of teenage superhumans rebel against the largest and most powerful organization of superhumans. The premise of the series resembles Gen¹³ in both the age and temperament of the main characters, with villain Toyo Harada's Harbinger Institute taking the place of WildStorm's I.O.

Gen¹³ also highly embraced the MTV Generation and built its sense of style on what was the contemporary fashion at the time, including the name Grunge (which was a quickly dated reference), references to popular bands such as Soundgarden, and a youthful drama inspired by MTV’s The Real World. Not coincidentally, Gen¹³s editor was Sarah Becker, a cast member on The Real World: Miami.

Collected editions
There have been a number of trade paperbacks collecting the Gen¹³ comic books, spin-off series, limited series, and specials.

In other media

Animation

Kevin Altieri (Batman: Mask of the Phantasm) directed a Gen¹³ animated feature for Buena Vista Pictures. It was shelved by the studio soon after Wildstorm was bought by DC Comics and never released in the United States, but it has seen a limited video release in Europe and Australia in 2000. Grunge was voiced by Flea of the Red Hot Chili Peppers, Lynch was voiced by John de Lancie, and Threshold was voiced by Mark Hamill.

Novels
Three Gen¹³ paperback novels were released:
Time and Chance, by Jeff Mariotte and Scott Ciencin, features a criminal mastermind who enjoys gambling. He captures the formula for creating superpowered beings and plans to use it to increase his power.
Netherwar, written by Jeff Mariotte and Christopher Golden, begins with an old ally of Lynch meeting with the group. International Operations has apparently made contact with the realm of Hell itself underneath a casino it secretly owns. Gen¹³ must infiltrate the already-affected building and close down the portal before all of humanity is doomed.
Version_2.0, written by Sholly Fisch, focuses on the diabolic plan of the team's old International Operations nemesis Ivana Baiul, who has fallen from the good graces of the government.

References

External links

Gen¹³ at the International Catalogue of Superheroes

Gen¹³ Complete Cover Gallery
Wildstorm Productions

1994 comics debuts
WildStorm superhero teams
WildStorm titles
DC Comics superhero teams
Characters created by Jim Lee
American comics adapted into films